HD 17156, named Nushagak by the IAU, is a yellow subgiant star approximately 255 light-years away in the constellation of Cassiopeia.  The apparent magnitude is 8.17, which means it is not visible to the naked eye but can be seen with good binoculars. A search for a binary companion star using adaptive optics at the MMT Observatory was negative.

The star is more massive and larger than the Sun while Its absolute magnitude of 3.70 and spectral type of G0,  show that it is both hotter and more luminous. Based on asteroseismic density constraints and stellar isochrones, it was found that the age is 3.37  billion years making it about two thirds as old as the Sun. Spectral observations show that the star is metal-rich.

An extrasolar planet, HD 17156 b, was discovered with the radial velocity method in 2007, and subsequently was observed to transit the star. At the time it was the transiting planet with the longest period.

Name

The star was given the name Nushagak by the IAU, chosen by United States representatives for the NameExoWorlds content, with the comment that "Nushagak is a regional river near Dilingham, Alaska, which is famous for its wild salmon that sustain local Indigenous communities." HD 17156 b was given the designation Mulchatna, as Mulchatna is a tributary of the Nushagak river.

Planetary system
It is the first star in Cassiopeia around which an orbiting planet was discovered (in 2007) using the radial velocity method. Later observations showed that this planet also transited the star. 
In February 2008, a second planet was proposed, with a 5:1 mean motion resonance to the inner planet HD 17156 b, though in 2017 this planet candidate was retracted.

See also
 List of stars with extrasolar planets

References

External links
 Extrasolar Planet Interactions by Rory Barnes & Richard Greenberg, Lunar and Planetary Lab, University of Arizona
 

Cassiopeia (constellation)
Planetary transit variables
Planetary systems with one confirmed planet
G-type subgiants
017156
013192
Durchmusterung objects
Nushagak